Gary Cooper (born London, 1968) is an English conductor and classical keyboardist who specialises in the harpsichord and fortepiano. He is known as an interpreter of the keyboard music of Bach and Mozart, and as a conductor of historically informed performances of music from the Renaissance, Baroque, Classical and Romantic periods.

Career
Gary Cooper studied organ and harpsichord at Chetham's School of Music, the John Loosemore Centre, and was an organ scholar at New College, Oxford, where he graduated with First Class Honours. In 1990 while still a student at Oxford, he co-founded New Chamber Opera, and has conducted many of their performances, including a complete recording of Rameau's cantatas and a new production of Handel's rarely performed opera, Orlando, at Sadler's Wells Theatre in 2006. Between 1992 and 2000, he was a member of the baroque ensemble, Trio Sonnerie, with whom he performed regularly throughout Europe and the United States.

Cooper made his Wigmore Hall solo recital debut on 1 December 2000 with a performance of Bach's complete Well-Tempered Clavier, and has frequently appeared as a recitalist both in the UK and in Europe. Several of his performances have been broadcast on BBC Radio 3, including his 22 November 2004 recital at the Cosmo Rodewald Concert Hall in Manchester and his 29 January 2006 Wigmore Hall performance of Mozart's sonatas for piano and violin with violinist Rachel Podger, broadcast live as part of the European Broadcasting Union's Mozart Day.

Gary Cooper has conducted for many ensembles including, the Akademie für Alte Musik Berlin, Irish Baroque Orchestra, Hanover Band, and English Touring Opera (Mozart's Die Entführung aus dem Serail and Handel's Alcina). He also teaches harpsichord and fortepiano at the Royal Welsh College of Music and Drama and the Birmingham Conservatoire, and is Visiting Professor of fortepiano at the Royal College of Music.

Selected recordings
Haydn: Late Piano Works (Sonata in C, Hob, xvi:48), Sonata in Eb, Hob, xvi:49, and Sonata in Eb, Hob.xvi:52) –  Gary Cooper (fortepiano). Label: Channel Classics
Haydn: Symphonies 41, 44, and 49 – Arion Baroque Orchestra, Gary Cooper (conductor). Label: Early-Music
Rameau: Complete Cantatas – New Chamber Opera, Gary Cooper (conductor). Label: 2 CD Gaudeamus 1999
Charpentier: Andromède H.504, Le Ballet de Polieucte H.498 – Giles Underwood, bass, James Gilchrist, tenor, Thomas Guthrie, baritone, Rachel Elliott, soprano, The Band of Instruments, Chorus, New Chamber Opera, Gary Cooper (conductor). Label: Gaudeamus 2002
Charpentier: Le Mariage forcé H.494, Les Fous divertissants H.500  –  John Bernays, bass, Nicolas Hurndall Smith, tenor, Rachel Elliott, soprano, Christoph Wittmann, countertenor, The Band of Instruments,  Chorus, New Chamber Opera, Gary Cooper (conductor). Label: ASV Gaudeamus 1997
Mozart: Sonatas for Keyboard & Violin – Gary Cooper (fortepiano), Rachel Podger (violin). Label: Channel Classics (in 8 volumes).  
Weelkes: Anthems – Oxford Camerata – Jeremy Summerly (conductor), Gary Cooper (organ). Label: Naxos
Shakespeare's Musick – Gary Cooper (virginal), Gary Cooper (harpsichord), Jacob Heringman (lute), Jeanette Ager (mezzo-soprano). Label: Philips Classics
Victoria: Requiem –  Gary Cooper (organ), Keith McGowan (bajan), The Sixteen. Label: Coro
Charles Avison: Sonatas for Harpsichord Opp. 5 and 7 – The Avison Ensemble, Gary Cooper (harpsichord). Label: Divine Art
John Garth: Accompanied Keyboard Sonatas Opp. 2 and 4 –  The Avison Ensemble, Gary Cooper (harpsichord, spinet, square piano & organ). Label: Divine Art

Notes and references

BBC Radio 3, A Bach Christmas, broadcast 19 December 2004.
BBC Radio 3, European Broadcast Union Mozart Day, broadcast 29 January 2006. 
Beaucage, Réjean, "Tempête et passion", Voir Montréal, 20 November 2008. Accessed 8 May 2009.
Crankshaw, Geoffrey, "Gary Cooper at the Wigmore Hall" (review), Musical Opinion, March 2001. Accessed via subscription 8 May 2009.
Fairclough, Pauline, "Harpsichordfest", The Guardian, 30 March 2004. Accessed 8 May 2009.
GoldbergWeb, "Ever present at New Chamber Opera events is the Company's founding conductor, Gary Cooper" (profile). Accessed 8 May 2009.
Griffiths, Paul, Paying Court to a Wry Master of the French Baroque  (review of Cantatas. New Chamber Opera Ensemble, conducted by Gary Cooper), New York Times, 7 April 2000. Accessed 8 May 2009.
Holden, Anthony, "Kindly get that mirror off the stage", The Observer, 25 March 2007. Accessed 8 May 2009.
Monk, Christopher, "Independent Opera's Orlando at Sadler's Wells" (review), Musical Opinion, January 2007. Accessed via subscription 8 May 2009.
Picard, Anna, "Review: Gary Cooper, Christchurch Spitalfields, London", The Independent, 30 June 2002. Accessed 8 May 2009.
Strini, Tom "Trio, flutist add life to Bach logic – Composer keeps them busy, but not too busy to have fun", Milwaukee Journal Sentinel, 22 March 1997. Accessed via subscription 8 May 2009.
Swed, Mark, "The sonata, unplugged: Performing Mozart's works for violin and fortepiano on, well, the violin and fortepiano restores harmony and the costar billing the composer intended", Los Angeles Times, 9 October 2005, p. E42. Accessed 8 May 2009.
Thicknesse, Robert "Opera review: Alcina", The Times, 18 October 2005. Accessed 8 May 2009.

External links
Artist's page Gary Cooper official web site on LoganArts Management

British male conductors (music)
British fortepianists
British harpsichordists
Alumni of New College, Oxford
Academics of the Royal College of Music
Living people
British performers of early music
People educated at Chetham's School of Music
21st-century British conductors (music)
21st-century classical pianists
21st-century British male musicians
1968 births